Ivan Aleksić (born 6 March 1993) is a Croatian footballer who plays as a left back for Vukovar.

Club career
Aleksić was born in Osijek on 6 March 1993. He began playing football casually as a young boy in his neighbourhood. He eventually started to enjoy this role and pursued to develop his skills in the youth teams of NK Višnjevac. At the age 12, he joined NK Osijek.

On 22 July 2011, Aleksić made his professional debut playing for NK Osijek against NK Rijeka, wearing the number 14. He made a total of 32 official appearances for NK Osijek.
He moved to FK Jagodina in summer 2014 but was not registered for the Serbian SuperLiga for the Autumn half season, because of their financial situation.

In January 2015, Aleksić left Serbia to play for NK Inter Zaprešić. Aleksić played his first game as a team starter against HNK Segesta Sisak in February 2015.  He scored his first goal for NK Inter Zaprešić against HNK Segesta Sisak on 27 March 2015. He helped NK Inter Zaprešić return to the Prva HNL.

In the summer of 2015 Aleksić signed for NK Novigrad. In the season 2015/2016 played a prominent role in NK Novigrad when they qualified for the Druga HNL.

On 19 July 2018, he joined Icelandic team KR. In the same month, Aleksić joined Keflavík on loan for the remainder of the season. On 30 July 2018, Aleksić made his league debut.

In September 2019, Aleksić signed for NK GOŠK Dubrovnik.

In January 2020, he moved to BSK Bijelo Brdo.

In the summer of 2021 Aleksić signed for HNK Vukovar '91. In the 2021/2022 season, the HNK Vukovar '91 team won the 3rd HNL, and advanced to a higher rank. Ivan Aleksić scored 11 goals and was the club's second scorer.

International career
Aleksić started his international career in the U15 national team. He played his first international match on 14 May 2008, wearing the number 3.

Aleksić has played for Croatia at every level from the under-15s to the under-20s.
Most notably, he was fielded in all of the three matches the under-20 team played in the group stage of the 2013 FIFA U-20 World Cup. Aleksić won 50 caps with the youth teams of the Croatia national team and remains uncapped with the senior team.

Honours
Inter Zaprešić
 Croatian Second League: 2014–15

References

External links

Ivan Aleksić at Sportnet.hr 

1993 births
Living people
Footballers from Osijek
Association football fullbacks
Croatian footballers
Croatia youth international footballers
NK Osijek players
NK Inter Zaprešić players
NK Novigrad players
Knattspyrnudeild Keflavík players
NK GOŠK Dubrovnik players
NK BSK Bijelo Brdo players
HNK Vukovar '91 players
Croatian Football League players
First Football League (Croatia) players
Úrvalsdeild karla (football) players
Croatian expatriate footballers
Expatriate footballers in Iceland
Croatian expatriate sportspeople in Iceland